Yamaha IT175 belongs to the 'International Trial' family of motorcycles, produced during the 1970s and 1980s. The machine is derived from the Yamaha YZ range of competition motocross bikes with modifications for use in competition enduro, hare and hounds and trail riding.

The bike uses an air-cooled, two-stroke, single-cylinder engine with pre-mixed fuel. It is kick start only.

There are three derivations of the machine for the global market. A U.S. and Canada market version, a European version and an Oceanic version for other World markets.

The IT bikes were designed and sold as enduros and can still be plated and registered today, provided you make the necessary modifications to the tail light. Another option is to get a historical plate and use the old brake signal along with your other hand signals for turning.

Other bikes in the IT range include IT125, IT200, IT250, IT425, IT465 and IT490.

The IT range was superseded by the WR (Wide Ratio) in 1991 with the introduction of the WR200, and the WR250 in 1993.

The Environmental Protection Agency (EPA) invoked new regulations restricting Two Strokes in the early 2000s and new rules were set by the American Motorcyclist Association (AMA) which set the path for the development of the less powerful four-stroke engines dominate in the sport today.

1977 
The IT175D was first introduced in 1977 using a bored out  motocross engine giving  and using the same port design as the YZ. A 34mm carburetor was used along with a reed intake valve. The bike was given a six-speed gearbox with a very low ratio first gear to help in tackling technical trial sections. The frame was based on that of the YZ but the steering rake was increased to lengthen the bike and improve high speed stability, facilitated by a high sixth gear. Rear suspension adopted lessons learned from the YZ and used a de carbon monoshock unit from Kayaba. Forks had less travel than those of the YZ

Considerable thought was given to features to improve reliability and usability over extended tests. The rear wheel featured a quick release design and a tool carrying kit was mounted to the rear fender.

1978 
Introduction of the IT175E. No major changes

1979 
The IT175F featured a beefed up frame and more suspension travel as per the mode of the times. The engine tune was modified slightly to give the bike more mid-range power.

The 1979 IT175F model front fork trail was reduced to quicken the steering response and the CDI ignition system was upgraded from the earlier D/E model bikes.....this was the last year for LH side countershaft sprocket model of the IT175. Check out Yamaha-Enduros group for great data on all early 2-stroke Yamahas.

1980 
For 1980 the IT175G caught up with the pace of motocross development and shared the frame of the YZ125G. This allowed the rear shock to move to a laid down position, bolted to the top of the frame backbone. The shock itself was adjustable for preload and rebound and a box section aluminum swingarm was used for the first time along with 36mm forks with air caps.

A new engine was developed in 1980, based loosely on the YZ125G. The new engine switched the drive chain to the right side where it has stayed ever since. The engine was detuned to give more usable power and given a 34mm power jet carburetor.

1981 
IT175H. No major changes other than all white plastics for the U.S. version.

1982 
IT175J. Major upgrade

1983 
IT175K. Minor upgrade.

References

IT175
Motorcycles introduced in 1977
Two-stroke motorcycles
Dual-sport motorcycles